This article lists events that occurred during 1962 in Estonia.

Incumbents

Events
Kalev Sports Hall built.

Births
11 June – Erika Salumäe, cyclist, olympic winner in 1988 and 1992

Deaths
27 June – Paul Viiding, poet, author and literary critic (b. 1904)

References

 
1960s in Estonia
Estonia
Estonia
Years of the 20th century in Estonia